Onfido is a technology company that helps businesses verify people's identities using a photo-based identity document, a selfie and artificial intelligence algorithms. It was founded in July 2012 by three former students at Oxford University: Cofounder Husayn Kassai, Cofounder Eamon Jubbawy, and Chief Architect Ruhul Amin. Onfido is headquartered in London and has over 650 employees in offices in San Francisco, Albuquerque, New York, Lisbon, Paris, Berlin, Amsterdam, Delhi, Mumbai, Bangalore and Singapore.

History 
Husayn Kassai, Eamon Jubbawy, and Ruhul Amin first met when they were students at Oxford University. Kassai met Jubbawy when they co-ran the university's Oxford Entrepreneurs society. At one point, the three entered discussions of forming a new company after they had identified the inefficient process of getting identity checks completed in order to secure jobs in the finance industry. Each went through a check that took from 2–6 weeks. The idea of Onfido came about to solve the inefficient process of identity checks. They wanted to create a solution that set a new standard by moving away from manual checks to a technological solution based on machine learning. The idea was built with four key aims: to help more people gain access to digital services, to protect businesses from fraud, to create a better user experience, and to uphold user privacy. They decided to build a technological solution to the problem and secured seed funding of £20,000 from Oxford University's Saïd Business School, launching Onfido in August 2012. The three secured initial deals with around 10 small companies. In January 2013, Onfido secured its first major client, Hassle.com.

In February 2015, Onfido raised $4.5 million from a Series A funding round to help expand the business. By April 2016 it had done almost ten million identity and background checks. The most recent funding round in April 2020 raised $100 million from TPG Growth.

While initially focused on doing identity and background checks for businesses hiring large numbers of permanent staff and contractors, by September 2016 it had shifted its focus to financial services and e-commerce companies. These companies are required to verify the identities of people with whom they do business as part of "Know Your Customer" (KYC) regulations and to help prevent fraud. Onfido helps them to do this without onerous identity verifications. The company also wants to help get people who don't currently have bank accounts into the banking system. Almost 40% of the world's adult population is excluded from opening a bank account, most often due to having thin credit files, or being new migrants without the requisite documents needed for in-person verification and legally required Anti-Money Laundering checks.

In 2019 the company had 1,500 customers.

Service 
Onfido (pronounced "On-Feed-Oh") helps businesses prove their users’ real identities through its online platform. If a person has a smartphone with a built-in camera, Onfido is able to use it to compare and cross-reference a person's facial biometrics with their identity document, such as driver's license. The person's identification can then be checked against global databases for any issues. It uses manual and automated machine learning technologies, including optical character recognition and face detection, to verify the passport or ID card of an applicant to prevent fraud. Onfido also conducts right to work, PEP and sanctions checks using multiple data sources.

As of 2021, the company has started investing in other fintech companies such as SEON Fraud Fighters.

Accolades 
In 2015, Onfido received an award at the inaugural TechCities Awards in the Thames Valley category. In 2016, Onfido made the FinTech50 list of companies that list the best new businesses. Also in 2016, Kassai, Jubbawy, and Amin appeared on Forbes annual 30 Under 30 list of top young leaders across 20 industries for Onfido.

In November 2018, Kassai was named to the Financial Times' list of the 'Top 100 minority ethnic leaders in technology.'

In August 2019, Onfido was awarded the Frost & Sullivan 2019 Technology Award  for its advanced hybrid identity verification solution and won the Barclays “Most Innovative Use of Technology” supplier award.  Also in 2019, Onfido was appointed to CB Insights AI 100, voted 1st (out of 2,000 companies) in the FinTech 50  and ranked 8th fastest growing private company in the UK in the 2019 Sunday Times Tech Track 100.

In 2020, Onfido won the InfoSec Award for Best Next Gen Fraud Prevention Product at RSA Conference.

See also
 FIDO Alliance, an industry consortium working on internet authentication mechanisms, including the U2F protocol for two-factor authentication.

References

External links 
 
Companies based in the City of London
British companies established in 2012
Software companies of the United Kingdom
Open-source intelligence
Online companies of the United Kingdom
Identity management systems